Canadiana refers to things related to the country of Canada.

Canadiana may also refer to:
 Canadiana (comics), a webcomic created by Sandy Carruthers
 Canadiana (horse), a Canadian Thoroughbred racehorse
 Canadiana.org, a non-profit digital library dedicated to preserving Canadian culture
 Canadiana (web series), a documentary web series about Canadian history
 Aethes canadiana, a moth of family Tortricidae
 SS Canadiana, a passenger ferry that operated between Buffalo, New York, United States and Crystal Beach, Ontario, Canada